Aleksandr Gavrilovich Dralkin (3 November 1911 – 2007) was a Soviet oceanologist, geographer and polar explorer. He was a leader of the Fourth Soviet Antarctic Expedition and the Seventh Soviet Antarctic Expedition. He also worked on the North Pole-4 drifting ice station (1954–1957) in the Arctic Ocean. Dralkin died in 2007.

References

1911 births
2007 deaths
Explorers of the Arctic
Russian and Soviet polar explorers
Russian explorers